Hacıosman is a village in the Sungurlu District of Çorum Province in Turkey. Its population is 317 (2022). The village is populated by Kurds.

References

Villages in Sungurlu District
Kurdish settlements in Çorum Province